Tsar Samuil  is a village on the Danube, in northeastern Bulgaria, part of Tutrakan Municipality, Silistra Province.

References

Villages in Silistra Province
Populated places on the Danube